Thomas Carlos Mehen (born September 8, 1970) is an American physicist. His research has consisted of primarily Quantum chromodynamics (QCD) and the application of effective field theory to problems in hadronic physics. He has also worked on effective field theory for non-relativistic particles whose short range interactions are characterized by a large scattering length, as well as novel field theories which arise from unusual limits of string theory.

Mehen was born in Tegucigalpa, Honduras where he learned Spanish as his first language. In 1974 at the age of three he relocated with his family to McLean, Virginia, USA. He was educated at the University of Virginia (B.S., 1992), and Johns Hopkins University (M.A., Ph.D., 1998). He served as a research associate and John A. McCone Postdoctoral Scholar in the Division of Mathematics, Physics and Astronomy at the California Institute of Technology from 1997 to 2000. He served as a research associate and University Postdoctoral Fellow in the Department of Physics at the Ohio State University from 2000–2001. In 2002 he joined the Department of Physics at Duke University as assistant professor where he is currently a tenured faculty member.

In 2005 Mehen received an Outstanding Junior Investigator Award in Nuclear Physics by the United States Department of Energy. He has contributed over 50 published works and is a lecturer in his field.

Publications 
 
 
 
 
 
 
 
 
 
 
 
 
 
 
 
 
 
 
 
 
 
 
 
 
 
 Heavy quark recombination and charm production asymmetries. Tom Mehen. May 2002. 12pp. Presented at DPF 2002: The Meeting of the Division of Particles and Fields of the American Physical Society, Williamsburg, Virginia, 24–28 May 2002.
 
 
 
 
 
 
 
 
 
 
 
 
 
 
 
 
 
 
 Leptoproduction of J / psi. Thomas Mehen. CALT-68-2198, Jul 1998. 5pp. Talk given at 29th International Conference on High-Energy Physics (ICHEP 98), Vancouver, Canada, 23-29 Jul 1998. In *Vancouver 1998, High energy physics, vol. 2* 1074–1078.

References

External links 
 SPIRES list of published papers: http://www.slac.stanford.edu/spires/find/hep/www?rawcmd=ea+Mehen,+Thomas
 Scientific Commons list of published papers: http://en.scientificcommons.org/thomas_mehen
 Website at Duke University: http://www.phy.duke.edu/~mehen/

1970 births
University of Virginia alumni
Johns Hopkins University alumni
Ohio State University faculty
Duke University faculty
Living people